Air Hostess is a 1949 American drama film directed by Lew Landers and starring Gloria Henry, Ross Ford and Audrey Long.

The film's sets were designed by the art director Harold H. MacArthur.

Premise
The film portrays a group of woman who arrive at an academy for air hostesses, following their ups and downs until graduation day.

Cast
 Gloria Henry as Ruth Jackson  
 Ross Ford as Dennis Hogan  
 Audrey Long as Lorraine Carter  
 Marjorie Lord as Jennifer White  
 William Wright as Fred MacCoy  
 Ann Doran as Virginia Barton  
 Olive Deering as Helen Field  
 Leatrice Joy as Celia Hansen  
 Barbara Billingsley as Madeline Moore  
 Harry Tyler as Jeff Farrell  
 Jessie Arnold as Mrs. Peabody  
 Irene Tedrow as Miss Hamilton  
 Grady Sutton as Ned Jenkins  
 Helen Mowery as Midge  
 Myron Healey as Ralph  
 Sarah Edwards as Bertha Hallum  
 Isabel Withers as Miss Fish  
 Harry Cheshire as Dr. Lee

References

Bibliography
 Michael L. Stephens. Art Directors in Cinema: A Worldwide Biographical Dictionary. McFarland, 2008.

External links
 

1949 films
1949 drama films
American drama films
Columbia Pictures films
Films directed by Lew Landers
American black-and-white films
Films about flight attendants
1940s English-language films
1940s American films